Jalal Jalalizadeh (born
in Sanandaj) is an Iranian Kurdish politician, University of Tehran professor, and political activist.

Jalalizadeh was advisor to Iran's interior minister and also a representative of Sanandaj in Iran's 6th parliament. He is now a member of Islamic Iran Participation Front (IIPF). In 2008 Jalalizadeh was sentenced to a year in prison after being charged with "propaganda against the state".

Works

Compilations and translations into Persian 
 "History of Jurisprudence and Jurists"
 "Kurds are descendants of the Medes"
 "The Last Journey (True Tragedy of a Kurdish Family)"
 "Talk Always"
 "The Exalted Passage"
 "Mirror of Sentences in Shafi'i Jurisprudence"
 "A Revolution in the Prophetic Tradition"
 "The Role of Marriage in Community Health"
 "History of the Principles of Jurisprudence"
 "Luminous Words"
 "Do we deserve democracy?"
 "Explanation of Problems"
 "Principles of Jurisprudence"

References

Iranian Kurdish politicians
Living people
Members of the 6th Islamic Consultative Assembly
Islamic Iran Participation Front politicians
Kurdish United Front politicians
Union of Islamic Iran People Party politicians
1960 births
Members of the National Council for Peace